The men's 5000 metres event at the 1995 Summer Universiade was held on 30–31 August at the Hakatanomori Athletic Stadium in Fukuoka, Japan.

Medalists

Results

Heats
Qualification: First 5 of each heat (Q) and the next 5 fastest (q) qualified for the final.

Final

References

Athletics at the 1995 Summer Universiade
1995